Jarra East is one of the six districts of the Lower River Division of the Gambia. In the 2013 census, it had a population of 16,551.

References 

Lower River Division
Districts of the Gambia